Bigg Boss 5 is the fifth season of the Indian reality TV show Bigg Boss, which aired on Colors TV from 2 October 2011 to 7 January 2012 with Sanjay Dutt and Salman Khan as the hosts.

During the launch on 2 October, fourteen hand-picked housemates entered the house located in Karjat, a town, about halfway between Mumbai and Pune in the Indian state of Maharashtra. Four additional wild card entries were made during the second, third, fourth and the end of seventh week taking the number of contestants to eighteen. Three guest entries, who stayed in the house for a couple of days, took the total number of inhabitants to twenty one. The housemates, considered strangers for each other, spent 98 days (14 weeks) locked out together under the supervision of 55 cameras fitted around the house.

The series was won by actress Juhi Parmar on 7 January 2012. Runner-Up, Mahek Chahal returned to compete in Bigg Boss Halla Bol.

Opening 
The opening episode was aired on 2 October 2011 presented by Sanjay Dutt and Salman Khan. This extravagant introductory episode to the season 5 showcased different features of the Bigg Boss house and introduced each of the participant. This season also had majority female contestants. It also featured Bollywood actors Ajay Devgn for the promo of their upcoming film Rascals and Samir Soni for promoting his new serial Parichay on Colors.

Housemates status

Housemates

Original entrants 
The participants in the order of appearance and entrance in the house are:
 Shakti Kapoor – Veteran Bollywood actor. He is known for his roles in many films like Dil Se Mile Dil, Jaani Dushman, Qurbani, Jis Desh Mein Ganga Rehta Hain, Chup Chup Ke and De Dana Dan. He also participated in dance reality show Nach Baliye with wife Shivangi Kolhapure.
 Pooja Bedi – Television personality and newspaper columnist. She is the daughter of actor Kabir Bedi who is known for her role in the film Jo Jeeta Wohi Sikandar. She later participated in Jhalak Dikhhla Jaa, Fear Factor: Khatron Ke Khiladi and Nach Baliye.
 Shonali Nagrani – Actress and model. She won the pageant of Miss India International in 2003 and subsequently finished first runner-up of Miss International. Alongside appearances as a model and as a television anchor most notably for the Indian Premier League shows for Sony TV India and ITV, she has appeared in supporting roles in films like Rab Ne Bana Di Jodi and Dil Bole Hadippa.
 Nihita Biswas – Charles Sobhraj's wife.
 Shraddha Sharma (actress)– TV actress and Raja Chaudhary's ex-girlfriend.
 Mandeep Bevli – News anchor. She was an anchor with Headlines Today, specializing mostly in entertainment related news.
Raageshwari Loomba – Singer. She shot to fame with her portrayal of a naughty Sardaji on BPL Oye. She has released many successful music albums and performed at numerous stage shows all over the world. From 2000 to 2001, she was diagnosed with and treated for Bell's Palsy (facial paralysis).
 Vida Samadzai – Former Miss Afghanistan. Her participation in the Miss Earth beauty pageant in 2003 was condemned by the Afghan Supreme Court, saying such a display of the female body goes against Islamic law and Afghan culture. In particular, traditionalists objected to her appearance in a red bikini during the pageant's press presentation. She was born and raised in a province of Afghanistan, and moved to America in 1996.
 Mahek Chahal – Bollywood actress. She is known for appearing in films like Chameli, Dil Apna Punjabi, Jai Veeru, Wanted, Main Aurr Mrs Khanna and Yamla Pagla Deewana. 
 Sonika Kaliraman – Wrestler. She participated in the stunt reality show Fear Factor: Khatron Ke Khiladi in 2009.
 Pooja Mishra – Reality TV alumni. She has previously participated in the reality show The Big Switch on UTV Bindass.
 Gulabo Sapera – Dancer. A well-known singer-dancer from Rajasthan, famous for folk style. Gulabo has a Jazz band with Titi Robin and teaches in Copenhagen, Denmark. She broke age-old traditions when took her culture on-stage at the age of 12, which was heavily promoted by the Late Prime Minister Rajiv Gandhi. She is married to Sohan Nath, whom she converted in to a Kalbelia and has five children.
 Laxmi Narayan Tripathi – LGBT rights activist. She holds the distinction of being the only Hijra in the UN's Civil Society Task Force on HIV/AIDS. She also works for the community through her campaign group 'Astitva'.
 Juhi Parmar – Television actress. She is well known for her role of Kumkum in the popular show Kumkum – Ek Pyara Sa Bandhan which aired on Star Plus. She later participated in the reality show Pati Patni Aur Woh with her husband Sachin Shroff.

Wild card entrants 
 Amar Upadhyay – Indian television actor. He is well known for his role of Mihir Virani in the popular Ekta Kapoor show Kyunki Saas Bhi Kabhi Bahu Thi. He was later seen in shows like Mehndi Tere Naam Ki, Des Mein Niklla Hoga Chand, Saathiya – Pyar Ka Naya Ehsaas and Kasautii Zindagii Kay.
 Siddharth Bhardwaj – Reality TV alumni. He participated and became the winner of MTV Splitsvilla with season 4 contestant Sakshi Pradhan.
 Akashdeep Saigal – Television actor. He played the negative lead as Ansh Virani in Kyunki Saas Bhi Kabhi Bahu Thi. He then played the lead in Kuchh Is Tara. He participated in reality shows like Jhalak Dikhhla Jaa, Fear Factor India and Iss Jungle Se Mujhe Bachao.
 Sunny Leone – Actress and former porn star. She was named Penthouse Pet of the Year in 2003 and was a contract star for Vivid Entertainment. Named by Maxim as one of the 12 top porn stars in 2010, she has also played roles in independent mainstream films and television shows.

Guest entrants 
 Swami Agnivesh - Social worker and Arya Samaj scholar. He was best known for his work against bonded labour through the Bonded Labour Liberation Front, which he founded in 1981. Agnivesh also founded and became president of the World Council of Arya Samaj, which he described as an associate of the original Arya Samaj, and served as the chairperson of the United Nations Voluntary Trust Fund on Contemporary Forms of Slavery from 2001 to 2004. He died on 11 September 2020.  He entered the house on Day 38 to Day 41. 
 Andrew Symonds – Cricketer. Symonds is a right-handed middle order batsman and alternates between medium pace and off-spin bowling. Since mid-2008, he spent most of the time out of the team, due to disciplinary reasons, including alcohol. In June 2009 he was sent home from the 2009 World Twenty20, his third suspension, expulsion or exclusion from selection in the space of a year. His central contract was then withdrawn, and many cricket analysts have speculated that the Australian administrators will no longer tolerate him, and that Symonds may announce his retirement. He entered on Day 67 to Day 78. He died in a car crash on 14 May 2022.

Guests appearances 
Yamamotoyama Ryūta
Yo Yo Honey Singh and Aditya Prateek Singh

Weekly synopsis

Guest appearances

Weekly tasks

Nominations table

Nomination notes

Controversies 
The participation of the pornographic actress Sunny Leone was criticised by the Indian Artistes and Actors Forum (IAAF), who sent a request to the Minister of Information and Broadcasting, Ambika Soni, to take action against Colors for indirectly encouraging and promoting pornography in India via the introduction of an adult entertainer.

The hosts Salman Khan and Sanjay Dutt were accused of intimidating behaviour towards some of the housemates, and some of the evicted housemates also accused Khan of favouring Mahek Chahal over other contestants. and Sanjay Dutt.

References

External links 
 Official website of Bigg Boss

2011 Indian television seasons
2012 Indian television seasons
05